Smithfield is a suburb in the northern outskirts of Adelaide, South Australia. It is in the City of Playford.

Geography
Smithfield has Main North Road as its eastern boundary, with service stations, the historic Smithfield Hotel and several other businesses and private residences. Anderson Walk is the southern boundary of the original village, which was arranged in a grid with Augusta Square in the centre. West of the older residential area is an industrial zone along the railway line, with Smithfield railway station on the south side of Anderson Walk. Munno Para Shopping City is on the south side of Smith Creek. There are more residential areas south and west of the railway station, and an Army Reserve depot west of the shopping centre which is home to the 3rd/9th Light Horse (South Australian Mounted Rifles) and 49 ACU Army Cadets.

History

Settlement
Settlement of Smithfield occurred circa 1850 when Scottish immigrant, John Smith took ownship of land where the main road north intersected with a freshwater course now known as Smith Creek (or Grant Creek). Smith built a homestead on his property in 1850 and set up part of it as a hotel to take advantage of traffic passing by on the main road. Smith planned a town and by 1853 section 3165 of the Hundred of Munno Para was surveyed and subdivided into town allotments. He donated land in 1855 to build the Presbyterian church and, by 1860, the fledgling town had a telegraph station, railway station, institute building, a store, and several other service providers. Gawler Plains post office had opened on 12 July 1850 and was renamed Smithfield in 1855.

Smithfield Speedway
A  speedway track was built in the Smithfield area in 1926 by the Motorcycle Club of South Australia. The exact location may have been in what is now Elizabeth Downs. The Smithfield Speedway was believed to be the first in the world to be promoted by a motorcycle club. The first meeting was scheduled for Wednesday 13 October 1926, but postponed to Saturday 16 October due to poor weather. The first race meeting was held before the grandstands were built, and the new track generated a lot of dust. It appears to have only operated until about 1930.

World War 2

During the Second World war, the government built some munitions/ordinance factory and storage facility here. Parts of it were demolished in later years.

Migrant Hostel

Following World War II, a migrant hostel was established on land no longer required for a munitions depot near the railway line at Smithfield. It was operated by the Commonwealth Government from 1949 until 1971 on the land between the railway line and Coventry Road. Single people were allocated space in a dormitory, families had a section of a larger building with two or three bedrooms and a sitting room. Cooking and eating was in a communal dining hall, and there were shared ablution blocks. It had accommodation for 100 people at the end of January 1949, and housed up to 300 people at a time. There was no charge to live in the hostel until the breadwinner of the family found a job. After that, the family was charged a rate proportional to their income for up to a year while they found a permanent home. The hostel was initially a "camp for Balts", housing displaced people from Europe. By 1951, it was also home to British migrants. The Girl Guides operated in the hostel.

Transport

 Smithfield railway station on the Gawler railway line was originally built with a station building and opened in June 1857. The original station building on the eastern platform was demolished in 1987 and has been replaced by shelters which have been incorporated into the Bus Interchange.

Trains to and from Adelaide on the Gawler railway line operate from Smithfield station every 15 minutes at peak times on Monday to Friday, and every 30 minutes during off-peak and all day on Saturday and Sunday. In the morning and afternoon/evening peak hours, there are several trains that run express making stops at Smithfield, Elizabeth, Parafield, Salisbury and Mawson Interchanges. These are used by a significant number of passengers who either park their vehicle or transfer from buses at Smithfield Interchange.

Local buses from Smithfield Interchange, scheduled to connect with trains to and from Adelaide, use the Adelaide Metro integrated ticketing system.

Notable people
 Thomas Charles Richmond Baker, DFC, MM & Bar (1897-1918), an Australian soldier, aviator, and flying ace of the First World War was born in Smithfield.
  Maxwell Edgar (Max) Fatchen, AM (1920-2012), Australian children's writer, poet and journalist lived in Jane Street from 1952 for 60 years.

See also
 City of Munno Para
 City of Playford

References

Suburbs of Adelaide